Ginger is a children's picture book by Charlotte Voake. In 1997 it won the Nestlé Smarties Book Prize Gold Award. It is about a pampered house cat who resents the sudden appearance of a kitten in her life. The book is followed by Ginger Finds a Home, a prequel, and Ginger and the Mystery Visitor, in which Ginger and the kitten confront a stranger.

References

1997 children's books
British picture books
Books about cats
Fictional cats
Walker Books books